Mato is a minor Austronesian language of northern Papua New Guinea just inside Morobe Province. Mato is also referred to by the names Nenaya, Nengaya, and Nineia. Mato language has two minor variations, Tabares and Remuk, and the two variations are each spoken in three separate villages. While Mato is surrounded by several other languages, this has no effect on the grammar changes within Mato boundaries. The linguistic situation is very stable, due in part to the geographical isolation of the Mato people.

Linguistics
Tabares and Remuk show a cognate similarity of 96% and among cognates there is a regular phonetic variation that occurs in the velar fricative; otherwise, the cognate words are usually pronounced the same. The grammar between the dialects does not vary; when it does differ, the residents of the Mato area said the words could be pronounced either way and that it depended on the preference of the speaker. The only minor difference that separate the variations is the constant phoneme .

(1)    →      'door' (Tabares speaker)

 →           'door' (Ramuk speaker)

(2)     →        'pig' (Tabares speaker)

 →             'pig' (Ramuk speaker)

(3)    →    'medicine' (Tabares speaker)

 →          'medicine' (Ramuk speaker)

The front mid-vowel  is usually pronounced  in word-final heavy syllables, but pronounced  elsewhere.

The back mid-vowel  is pronounced  in closed syllables in just a few words but pronounced  elsewhere.

The diphthong  is usually pronounced  in rapid speech, and the diphthong  is usually pronounced  in rapid speech.

Consonant phonemes

Phonemic inventory

Sentence typology is subject–verb–object (SVO).

References 

Ngero–Vitiaz languages
Languages of Morobe Province